Abed "Tony" Arefin (April 23, 1962 – May 1, 2000), was an influential graphic designer who designed many fine-art catalogues in the 1990s. He was the chief art director of Frieze, the contemporary art magazine.

Early life in Pakistan and Bangladesh

Arefin was born in Karachi, Pakistan in 1962. Later moving to Dhaka, Bangladesh before immigrating with his parents to London.

Career
Arefin moved to New York to work for Bomb magazine.

References

External links
 NY Times Obituary

1962 births
2000 deaths
Bangladeshi art directors
Artists from Dhaka